Tomos may refer to:

 Tomos (Eastern Orthodox Church)
 Tomos, a former moped manufacturer from Slovenia